MT2 may refer to:

Melatonin receptor 1B
Metallothionein 2A
Metals Treatment Technologies
(Methyl-Co(III) methylamine-specific corrinoid protein):coenzyme M methyltransferase
Montana Highway 2
Montana's 2nd congressional district
MT2Trading Platform
Morse taper size 2